The Brachyopina is a subtribe of hoverflies.

List of genera 
Brachyopa Meigen, 1822
Cacoceria Hull, 1936
Chromocheilosia Hull, 1950
Chrysogaster Meigen, 1803
Chrysosyrphus Sedman, 1965
Cyphipelta Bigot, 1859
Hammerschmidtia Fallén, 1817
Hemilampra Macquart, 1850
Lejogaster Rondani, 1857
Lepidomyia Loew, 1864
Liochrysogaster Stackelberg, 1924
Melanogaster Rondani, 1857
Myolepta Loew, 1864
Orthonevra Macquart, 1829
Riponnensia Maibach, 1994

References 

Eristalinae
Insect subtribes